Larissa Pimenta (born 1 March 1999) is a Brazilian judoka. At the 2019 Pan American Games held in Lima, Peru, she won the gold medal in the 52 kg event. She is also a three-time gold medalist in her event at the Pan American Judo Championships. She also represented Brazil at the 2020 Summer Olympics in Tokyo, Japan.

Career
She won the gold medal in the women's 52 kg event at the 2018 South American Games held in Cochabamba, Bolivia.

At the 2019 Pan American Judo Championships, held in Lima, Peru, she won the gold medal in the 52 kg event. In that same year, she competed in the women's 52 kg event at the 2019 World Judo Championships held in Tokyo, Japan. She won her first match, against Raguib Abdourahman of Djibouti, but was eliminated in her next match, against Uta Abe of Japan, who went on to win the gold medal. In 2019, she also won one of the bronze medals in the women's team event at the Military World Games held in Wuhan, China.

In 2020, she won one of the bronze medals in the women's 52 kg event at the Pan American Judo Championships held in Guadalajara, Mexico. In 2021, she competed in the women's 52 kg event at the Judo World Masters held in Doha, Qatar. A few months later, she secured the gold medal in her event at the 2021 Pan American Judo Championships held in Guadalajara, Mexico. In June 2021, she won one of the bronze medals in the mixed team event at the 2021 World Judo Championships held in Budapest, Hungary. She also competed in the women's 52 kg event where she was eliminated in her second match.

In 2021, she represented Brazil at the 2020 Summer Olympics in Tokyo, Japan. She competed in the women's 52 kg event where she was eliminated in her second match by eventual gold medalist Uta Abe of Japan. Pimenta was also part of the mixed teams competition, losing her fights for twice facing competitors in higher weight categories.

Achievements

References

External links
 

Living people
1999 births
Brazilian female judoka
South American Games gold medalists for Brazil
South American Games medalists in judo
Competitors at the 2018 South American Games
Pan American Games medalists in judo
Pan American Games gold medalists for Brazil
Medalists at the 2019 Pan American Games
Judoka at the 2019 Pan American Games
Judoka at the 2020 Summer Olympics
Olympic judoka of Brazil
Sportspeople from São Paulo (state)
21st-century Brazilian women